Killing a Mouse on Sunday is a 1961 thriller novel by the British-Hungarian writer Emeric Pressburger, best known as a film producer. In Francoist Spain a Civil Guard officer attempts to lure a notorious exiled guerilla fighter back across the border from France.

The anarchist Quico Sabaté's death inspired the book.

Adaptation
In 1964 it was adapted into a Hollywood film Behold a Pale Horse directed by Fred Zinnemann and starring Gregory Peck, Anthony Quinn, and Omar Sharif.

References

Bibliography
 Goble, Alan. The Complete Index to Literary Sources in Film. Walter de Gruyter, 1999.

1961 British novels
Hungarian novels
Novels set in Spain
British novels adapted into films
Hungarian novels adapted into films
British thriller novels
William Collins, Sons books